A list of notable botanical gardens in Andalusia, Spain.

 Alameda del Tajo
 Jardín Botánico del Albardinal
 Jardín Botánico El Aljibe
 Arboreto Carambolo
 Jardín Botánico El Ángel
 Arboretum La Alfaguara
 Jardín Botánico El Castillejo
 Jardín Botánico La Concepción
 Jardín histórico la Cónsula
 Jardín Botánico de la Cortijuela
 Jardín Botánico de Córdoba
 Jardín Botánico Dunas del Odiel
 Jardín Botánico de la Universidad de Granada
 Jardín Botánico el Hornico
 Jardín Botánico Universitario de Sierra Nevada
 Jardín Botánico Hoya de Pedraza
 Jardines de la Finca San José
 Jardín Botánico (Cádiz)
 Jardín Botánico de Sanlúcar
 Zoobotánico Jerez
 Jardín Botánico Molino de Inca
 Jardín Botánico Mora i Bravard
 Jardín Botánico de la Universidad de Málaga
 Parque botánico José Celestino Mutis
 Parque de Málaga
 Jardín histórico el Retiro
 Jardín Botánico El Robledo
 Jardín Botánico de San Fernando
 Jardín Botánico de Sierras Tejeda, Alhama y Almijara
 Jardín Botánico Torre del Vinagre
 Jardín Botánico de la Umbría de la Virgen
 Arboreto El Villar